Ettore Caffaratti (12 May 1886 – 9 January 1969) was an Italian horse rider who competed in the 1920 Summer Olympics. He also served as a general in the Royal Italian Army during World War II.

Biography
In 1920 he and his horse Caniche won the silver medal in the team eventing and the bronze medal in the individual eventing. He also won the bronze medal in the team show jumping competition with his horse Tradittore.

References

External links 
 
 Italian Olympians CAB-CAG 
 
 
 

1886 births
1969 deaths
Italian event riders
Italian generals
Italian military personnel of World War I
Italian military personnel of World War II
Italian show jumping riders
Olympic equestrians of Italy
Italian male equestrians
Equestrians at the 1920 Summer Olympics
Olympic silver medalists for Italy
Olympic bronze medalists for Italy
Olympic medalists in equestrian
Medalists at the 1920 Summer Olympics
Recipients of the Silver Medal of Military Valor